Manuel Silvestre de Salamanca Cano was governor of the Captaincy General of Chile between March 1734 and November 1737.

He was the nephew of the earlier governor Gabriel Cano de Aponte and was the Maestro de Campo of its government. He was married in Concepcion to Isabel de Zabala.

Royal Governors of Chile
18th-century Spanish people
Year of death unknown
Year of birth unknown